Basket of Bread (1945) or Basket of Bread-Rather Death Than Shame is a painting by Spanish Surrealist Salvador Dalí. The painting depicts a heel of a loaf bread in a basket, sitting near the edge of a table.  Dalí's use of bread in his paintings is said  to contain messages about the political context at the time of the painting, his progression as an artist, and his societal beliefs.

Progression and comparison to The Basket of Bread (1926)
Dalí used bread in many of his paintings, and was quoted as saying:
"Bread has always been one of the oldest subjects of fetishism and obsession in my work, the first and the one to which I have remained the most faithful. I painted the same subject 19 years ago. By making a very careful comparison of the two pictures, everyone can study all the history of painting right there, from the linear charm of primitivism to stereoscopic hyper-aestheticism."

At 22, Dalí spent four months on the 1926 painting The Basket of Bread, of which he said: "by the power of its density, the fascination of its immobility, creates the mystical, paroxysmic feeling of a situation beyond our ordinary notion of the real.  We are at the borderline of dematerialization of matter by the sole power of the mind."

The loaf of bread, painted and completed in Monterey, California in 1945, he described to Luis Romero as "the most esoteric and the most Surrealist of anything I have painted to date," where the painting is even more dynamic [than the 1926 version] by having the basket of bread placed on the edge of the table, giving a strong sense of forthcoming "borderline of dematerialization".

Political context

Dalí wrote in the Bignou Gallery of New York catalogue that he painted Basket of Bread in two months, when "the most staggering and sensational episodes of contemporary history took place" and finished "one day before the end of the war".

The painting's subtitle, Rather Death than Shame, takes on special significance during this time period.  The basket is situated on the edge of the uncovered table, against a starkly black backdrop, an omen to its own sacrificial destruction.

Adolf Hitler, a well-recorded subject by Dalí , shot himself before he could be captured on April 30, 1945.  In Dalí's essay, "The Conquest of the Irrational" written in 1935, Dalí speaks of a "moral hunger" of the modern age that the German people sought relief through Hitler and National Socialism.  Dalí writes that Hitler's followers were "systematically cretinized by machinism" and "ideological disorder", in which they "seek in vain to bite into the senile and triumphant softness of the plump, atavistic, tender, militaristic, and territorial back of any Hitlerian nursemaid." Further, this "irrational hunger is placed before a cultural dining table on which are found only ... cold and insubstantial leftovers." Hitler portrayed as the heel of a loaf of bread, on the edge of a precipice, sums up Dalí's opinion of Hitler and his ultimate demise. 

The painting was also said by Dalí to have been painted the week the atomic bombs fell on Japan. "My objective was to arrive at the immobility of the pre-explosive object", Dalí revealed.

Marshall Plan
Basket of Bread was used for the European Recovery Program, better known as the Marshall Plan from 1947 to 1951.  The Marshall Plan, which earned General George C. Marshall the Nobel Peace Prize, is credited with rebuilding European nations by restoring agricultural and industrial production and thereby restoring food supply and economic infrastructure in the aftermath of World War II.

Popularity and current location
In the 1940s, William Nichols, managing editor of This Week, a syndicated Sunday magazine, saw the picture in an art gallery. Finding it one of the most charming paintings he had ever seen he printed it in his magazine, giving Dali his first mass audience. This Week Magazine,  at one time had a circulation of 15 million, the largest in the world.

The painting resides in Figueres Teatre-Museu Dalí, containing the broadest range of works of Salvador Dalí (1904–1989), managed by the Gala-Salvador Dalí Foundation.

References

External links
 Basket of Bread at Virtual Dali.com

Paintings by Salvador Dalí
1945 paintings
Food and drink paintings
Collection of the Dalí Theatre and Museum